Chris McCarrell (born January 9, 1991) is an American theater and television actor and singer. He is best known for portraying Marius Pontmercy in the Broadway revival of Les Misérables, and for originating the titular character in The Lightning Thief: The Percy Jackson Musical in its Off-Broadway premiere, 2019 tour, and Broadway production.

Early life and education 
McCarrell grew up in Aurora, Ohio. His mother, DeAnna McCarrell, worked as a guidance counselor in Aurora City Schools, and his father, Bernie McCarrell, a wood shop teacher in Ravenna, Ohio.

McCarrell attended University School, an all boys private high school in Hunting Valley, OH. Shortly before his freshman year, McCarrell attended a party for the retiring headmaster, where alumni in the performing arts came and performed. On the ride home, he told his parents he wanted to be a musical theatre major, and cites that as the night he knew he wanted to act.

After high school, McCarrell attended Baldwin Wallace Conservatory of Music where he was a musical theatre major. While at Baldwin Wallace, he performed in many university shows, including Wild Party (Phil), Pippin (Lewis), Rent (Mark), Titanic (J. Bruce Ismay), Sweeney Todd (Anthony), and Next to Normal (Gabe Goodman). He graduated in 2013.

Career
Soon after graduating, McCarrell began acting professionally in regional productions of shows, including the lead roles in Summer of '42 and the original production of Bubble Boy.

Later in 2013, McCarrell was cast in a concert of 35MM. The show was on October 7, 2013, at 54 Below and the cast included many Broadway stars such as Lauren Pritchard (Spring Awakening), Lesli Margherita (Matilda), and Zachary Levi (First Date), among others.

McCarrell went on to audition for the 2014 Broadway Revival of Les Misérables, originally reading for the role of Marius Pontmercy. However, a few months after his original reading, he was called back to audition for one of the other students, Joly. McCarrell was then hired to perform as Joly, as well as understudy the role of Marius. During the same year, McCarrell was cast as Lost Boy Nibs in the NBC television special, Peter Pan Live!  which aired on December 4, 2014.

After a brief rehearsal period, McCarrell officially replaced cast member Andy Mientus in Les Misérables on March 3, 2015, and performed as Marius at the Imperial Theatre until the show's closing on September 4, 2016.

On June 1, 2015, McCarrell performed a sold-out solo concert at 54 Below, and appeared there again on December 7, 2015 in "Christmas Carols with Chris McCarrell".

Following the end of Les Misérables, McCarrell performed as the titular character in The Lightning Thief: The Percy Jackson Musical, which ran from March 23, 2017, to May 6, 2017, at the Lucille Lortel Theatre. On August 28, 2017, he reprised his role as Percy in a sold-out The Lightning Thief musical concert at The Green Room 42. In late 2019 to early 2020, he played Percy in the Broadway run of The Lightning Thief.

Theatre

Filmography

References 

21st-century American male actors
American LGBT actors
Male actors from Cleveland
1991 births
Living people
21st-century LGBT people